The Czech Hiking Markers Standard is an international system of hiking markers for tourist trails, used in more countries than any competing standard. The signs and markers can be used in both wilderness and cities. They are internationally well understandable as they grow from similar tradition in other Central European countries.

Basic hiking markers 

 The trail usually starts with arrow signs with names of destinations and number of kilometres marked. Each trail is then colour marked by simple markers and arrows painted between white lines (for better visibility) on fixed objects along the trail (trees, rocks, utility posts or walls) in a colour given to a specific trail. 

Basic implementation of the system requires only a color paint and a brush (plus a cardboard cut matrix for even size of the signs), with which an entire country can be marked. Nevertheless, many other also very modern features can be added. The paint is chosen so that it does not impact on the surrounding environment.

Additional features 

The basic system of trails with markers painted along the trail can be complemented by other features. These additional features are not necessary for the basic functioning of the system though.

 Information boards along the trail, giving information about the trail and its difficulty, nature protection, monuments, animals and trees along the trail. Logos of the supervising institution can be shown.
 Printed Maps with coloured lines showing the trails. 
 GPS information on each trail, board or sign
 Mobile phone application with a map and site descriptions (electronic tourist guide) contains additional information about the trail difficulty, slope inclination, gives the opportunity of hike planning and features that would not be possible on the signs etc.

Usage and extent
This method of trail blazing has a wide international usage in most of Central and Eastern Europe (including the Balkans and Caucasus), with showcase examples also in parts of Latin America and Asia.

 The system has been used by the Czech Hiking Club since 1888. The entire territory of the Czech Republic is covered with marked trails, and detailed maps are published and widely available. In the Czech Republic, over 70,000 km of hiking trails have been marked in this way. Of these, 39,816 km of hiking trails were marked in 2008. An additional 31,104 km of cycling trails, 387 km of skiing trails, and 1300 km of horse riding trails are also marked. In 1938 it was the longest system in the world, but now it is the densest network.

Maps of the trails have also been made into a number of digital applications - both Apple and Android for mobile phones, on Google Maps, and on the Czech "Mapy.cz" (and its version for foreigners called "WindyMaps").

Czech Markers standard
This system uses three bars - usually one colour in between two white bars, with different meanings attached to different colours:
 red indicates the most difficult or summit trails;
 blue for significant trails;
 yellow and green for easy or interconnecting trails.
These marks may be posted on wooden boards or metallic plates.
 Basic trail markers are square, 10x10 cm in size. The volunteers marking these trails usually prepare sheet metal or cardboard matrices to keep the signs uniform in size.
 Any change of direction is marked with arrows of the same colour and similar design. There are also symbols for short side-trails (to peak or lookout, ruin, well or spring, or other point of interest) and for the end of the trail.

The system is usually supplemented by maps, which show the trails as lines in corresponding colours. Nevertheless, maps are not necessary for the system to function, as walkers can simply follow the trail from marker to marker.

Czech Markers around the world 
Due to the relative ease of use and low cost, the system has spread to many other countries, often by Czech people. Originally used in the Czech Republic, the system spread through Central Europe and Eastern Europe and even to countries outside Europe. Nearly identical systems exist in the neighbouring countries of Austria and Poland.

 Austria's standard is almost identical, with red-white-red stripes used instead of white-red-white The same colours are used in the Czech Republic for cycling trails.
 Azerbaijan. 
 Brazil.
 Bosnia - Maglić Mountain
 Bulgaria 
 Croatia especially on the island of Krk, with a map available in local tourist centers. The Czech Tourist Club marked a network of historical goat trails that can now be used by tourists hiking in the mountains.
 Czech Republic - fully covered with marked trails and detailed maps and the densest trail network in the world
 Georgia - Caucasus trails marked by Czech volunteers, particularly the mountain border between Georgia, Ingushetia, Chechnya and Dagestan.
 Hungary
 Israel - trail markers are larger (approximately 20x15 cm) but based on the same three stripe scheme. Long trails add a purple (regional) or orange (national) dot on the right white stripe.
 Peru 
 Philippines - Three new trails were marked to showcase the system on Mount Kanlaon Volcano, Negros Island, with the trail marked by Czech volunteers from Mendel University, in cooperation with the Czech Embassy. Additional new and more extensive trails have been marked in 2017;
 Poland - these markers are especially common on trails near the Czech and Slovak borders. The system is a slight expansion of the Czech model, adding black to the four colours used in the Czech markers.
 Romania - 300-400 km of trails marked by the Czech Tourist Club in the Banat region, as well as a 360 km mountain trail leading from Slovakia across Ukraine to Romania.
 Slovakia fully covered with marked trails and detailed maps
 Switzerland uses a modified form with blue marking Alpine trails, which are more difficult than red trails
 Ukraine especially in Subcarpathian Ukraine and Crimea with some 700 km of trails marked in 2011 in Subcarpathia and continuing efforts by Czech, Ukraininan and Polish volunteers to mark additional routes with part of the program sponsored by the Czech Ministry of Foreign Affairs. Maps of the trails are available.

References

Hiking
Outdoor recreation
Signage
Trails
Tourism in the Czech Republic